Miloš Raović (born 12 May 1994) is a Serbian sprinter who specializes in the 400 meters. He participated for Serbia at the 2014 European Athletics Championships.

Running career 
Raović established himself as an international level sprinter after training with AK Partizan.

Originally Raović started out as a hurdler but made a transition to sprinting. He made his international debut at the 2011 World Youth Championships in Athletics in the boy's 400 meters, where he ran under the 50 second barrier. He then appeared at the 2012 World Junior Championships in Athletics, where he also ran the 400. His last major international race as a junior was the 400 at the 2013 European Athletics Junior Championships. He placed third overall in the Second League men's 400 meters of the 2013 European Team Championships. In the same competition (also in the Second League) at the following year he placed second overall in the 400 meters.

References

Serbian male sprinters
Living people
1994 births
People from Priboj